The term R-matrix has several meanings, depending on the field of study.

The term R-matrix is used in connection with the Yang–Baxter equation. This is an equation which was first introduced in the field of statistical mechanics, taking its name from independent work of C. N. Yang and R. J. Baxter. The classical R-matrix arises in the definition of the classical Yang–Baxter equation.

In quasitriangular Hopf algebra, the R-matrix is a solution of the Yang–Baxter equation.

The numerical modeling of diffraction gratings in optical science can be performed using the R-matrix propagation algorithm.

R-matrix method in quantum mechanics

There is a method in computational quantum mechanics for studying scattering known as the R-matrix.  This method was originally formulated for studying resonances in nuclear scattering by Wigner and Eisenbud. Using that work as a basis, an R-matrix method was developed for electron, positron and photon scattering by atoms. This approach was later adapted for electron, positron and photon scattering by molecules.

R-matrix method is used in UKRmol and UKRmol+ code suits. The user-friendly software  Quantemol Electron Collisions (Quantemol-EC) and its predecessor  Quantemol-N are based on UKRmol/UKRmol+ and employ MOLPRO package for electron configuration calculations.

See also
 UK Molecular R-matrix Codes

References

Matrices